Nella Simaová (born 21 July 1988) is a Czech former competitive figure skater. She is the 2006 Golden Spin of Zagreb champion and a two-time Czech national champion (2008 and 2009). She qualified to the free skate at three ISU Championships – 2006 Junior Worlds in Ljubljana, Slovenia; 2008 Europeans in Zagreb, Croatia; and 2009 Europeans in Helsinki, Finland.

Programs

Results
JGP: Junior Grand Prix

References

External links

 

Czech female single skaters
Figure skaters from Brno
Living people
1988 births
Competitors at the 2009 Winter Universiade